Khayyam Hadi oglu Mirzazade (5 October 1935 – 30 July 2018) was an Azerbaijani composer and professor.

Biography
Khayyam Mirzazade was born on October 5, 1935, in Baku. In 1957, he graduated from Azerbaijan State Conservatoire. From 1957, he taught at Azerbaijan State Conservatoire. From 1969 to 1983, he was a manager of composition cathedra at Azerbaijan State Conservatoire. Khayyam Mirzazade is the author of symphonic and chamber compositions, music to drama spectacles and movies and lyric songs.

On October 7, 2000, he was awarded with Shohrat Order by the President of Azerbaijan.

Titles and awards
 Honored Art Worker of the Azerbaijan SSR (1972)
 People's Artist of the Azerbaijan SSR (1987)
 Lenin Komsomol Prize of the Azerbaijan SSR (1970)
 State premiums of Azerbaijan (1976, 1986)
 “Shohrat” Order (2000)

Compositions
For chorus, soloist and symphony orchestra:
 “Blossom, our Motherland” cantata (together with E.Mahmudov, lyrics by Z.Jabbarzade, 1964)
 Ode about party (lyrics by B.Vahabzade, 1975)

For symphony orchestra:
 Symphony I (1957)
 Symphony II (Triptych, 1970)
 Little lyric suite (1963)
 Sketches-63 (1963)
 “In Mughan fields” suite (1967)

For chamber orchestra:
 Music (1964)
 3 choreographic scenes (1969)

For woodwind instruments:
 Sextet (1962)

For string quartet:
 Quartet I (1956)
 Quartet II (1961)
 Four miniatures (1958)
 Norashen dances (1972)

For brass instruments:
 Quartet (1970)

For violin and fortepiano:
 Sonatina (1950)
 A poem and scherzo (1952)

For solo instrument
 Genesis, Sonata for viola solo (1982)

Music to movies
 1961 – “Our street”
 1964 – “Summit” (a plot in film-almanach “Whom do we love much”
 1970 – “My seven sons”
 1972 – “I grew up at the seaside”
 1973 – “Along a dangerous marine way” (short-movie)
 1974 – “Winds blow in Baku”
 1977 – “A stab in the back”
 1978 – “Country house for one family”
 1981 – “The day after tomorrow, at midnight”
 1985 – “Cottage season”
 1987 – “Aphrodite’s hands” (short movie)
 1990 – “Basement”
 1993 – “My white city”
 1993 – “Hello from another world”
 1993-2002 – “Shooting is postponed”

References

1935 births
2018 deaths
Azerbaijani composers
20th-century classical composers
Musicians from Baku
Soviet film score composers
Male film score composers
Baku Academy of Music alumni
People's Artists of Azerbaijan
Soviet Azerbaijani people
Recipients of the Shohrat Order
20th-century male musicians
Honored Art Workers of the Azerbaijan SSR